Aslam Parvez (12 February 1932 – 21 November 1984) was a Pakistani film actor.

Career
Born as Chaudhary Muhammad Aslam into a family of traders in Lahore, Punjab, British India on 12 February 1932. Aslam Parvez entered the Pakistani film industry in the year 1955 at the age of 23. He started his film career in film producer Anwar Kamal Pasha's film Qatil (1955) as a side hero. Thereafter he played the leading role in the Punjabi language film Patay Khan  opposite Noor Jehan. In film Koel (1959), Aslam Pervaiz performed a leading role opposite film actresses Noor Jehan and Neelo. He played the villain in movies like Saheli (1960), Insaan aur Admi (1970), Tehzeeb  (1971) and Baharo Phool Barsao (1972).

Selected filmography
{|class="wikitable"
|-
!Title !!Year
|-
|Qatil
|1955
|-
|Paatay Khan
|1955
|-
|Chann Mahi
|1956
|-
|Chhoo Mantar
|1958
|-
|Koel
|1959
|-
|Neend|1959
|-
|Rahguzar|1960
|-
|Saheli|1960
|-
|Isq Per Zor Nahin|1963
|-
|Shikwa|1963
|-
|Daaman|1963
|-
|Kaneez|1965
|-
|Malangi|1965
|-
|Payal Ki Jhankar|1966
|-
|Aag|1967
|-
|Dil Mera Dharkan Teri|1968
|-
|Behan Bhai|1968
|-
|Tehzeeb|1971
|-
|Jeera Blade|1973
|-
|Rangeela Aur Munawar Zarif|1973
|-
|Sheeda Pastole|1975
|-
|Badtameez|1976
|-
|Society Girl| 1976
|-
|Mohabbat Aur Mehangai|1976
|-
|Amanat|1981
|-
|Dehleez|1983
|-
|Miss Colombo|1984
|-
|Doorian|1984
|-
|Khuddar|1985
|-
|}

Personal life
He was married to his second cousin Surraiya before he joined the Pakistani film industry. They have left behind four children, two sons and two daughters. Zulfiqar Aslam, Asghar Aslam, Aasiya Aslam and Aqsa Aslam.

Death
While coming from a shooting of a film, he was injured in a car accident and died of injuries from that accident one week later in a hospital on 21 November 1984. A fellow actor, Iqbal Hassan, was driving the car and died shortly after this accident.Actor Aslam Pervaiz remembered on his 36th death anniversary Daily Times (newspaper), Published 22 November 2020, Retrieved 28 June 2021

Awards
1970 Nigar Award Best Supporting Actor-film Insaan Aur Aadmi (1970)
1981 Nigar Award Special Award for 30 years of excellence in films
1984 Nigar Award Special Award for Miss Colombo'' (1984)
2018 Pride of Performance award by the President of Pakistan

References

External links
 

1984 deaths
1932 births
Pakistani male film actors
Nigar Award winners
20th-century Pakistani male actors
Recipients of the Pride of Performance
Male actors in Urdu cinema
Male actors in Punjabi cinema